National Gallery of Modern Art is an art gallery in New Delhi, India

National Gallery of Modern Art may also refer to:
 National Gallery of Modern Art, Mumbai, India
 National Gallery of Modern Art, Bangalore, India
 National Gallery of Modern Art, Lagos, Nigeria
 , Rome, Italy
 Scottish National Gallery of Modern Art, Scotland, UK

See also
 Gallery of Modern Art (disambiguation)